Marzio Martelli (born 14 December 1971) is a former professional tennis player from Italy.

In 1996, Martelli reached the semi-finals of the Campionati Internazionali di Sicilia, as a qualifier. En route he defeated second seed Alberto Berasategui.

Martelli made the second round of two Grand Slams in 1997, at Wimbledon and the French Open. On the 1997 ATP Tour, he had his best result at the Bologna Outdoor tournament, beating two top 50 players on the way to a semi-final appearance. He was also a member of the Italian Davis Cup team which won against  Spain that year in the quarter-finals of the World Group. In what would be the only Davis Cup rubber he would ever play, Martelli was defeated by Carlos Moyá, but he did manage to win the second set against the Australian Open runner-up.

He lost a four set match to Andre Agassi in the opening round of the 1998 Australian Open. In his fourth and final Grand Slam appearance, at the 1998 French Open, the Italian defeated world number 25 Goran Ivanišević in the first round but was unable to progress any further, losing his next match to Filip Dewulf. Also in 1998, Martelli put in another good Bologna Outdoor performance, reaching the quarter-finals.

Challenger Titles

Singles: (1)

References

1971 births
Living people
Italian male tennis players
Sportspeople from Livorno